Lee Kelly is an American artist.

List of works

Paintings
 Untitled
 Untitled
 Untitled (1959)

Sculptures

 Untitled (LK791)
 Untitled (LK793)
 Untitled Study (Icarus in Yucatan)
 Untitled (LK789) (1959)
 Untitled (LK797) (c. 1961)
 Tree of Life (1964), with Bonnie Bronson
 Untitled (LK790) (1965)
 Untitled (Bumper) II (1966–1967)
 Untitled (Bumper) III (1966–1967)
 Untitled (Bumper) IV (1966–1967)
 Untitled (Bumper) V (1966–1967)
 Untitled (Bumper) VI (1966–1967)
 Untitled (Bumper) VII (1966–1967)
 Untitled (Bumper) VIII (1966–1967)
 Untitled (Bumper) IX (1966–1967)
 Untitled (Bumper) X (1966–1967)
 Untitled (Bumper) XI (1966–1967)
 Untitled (Bumper) (1967/2004)
 (Unthank Park Cylindric Sculpture) (1967–1968), Unthank Park, Portland, Oregon
 Study for a Large Sculpture #5 (1969)
 Gate F (1973), Candlestick Park, San Francisco, California
 Untitled (1973), Olympia, Washington
 Frank E. Beach Memorial Fountain (1975), also known as Water Sculpture, International Rose Test Garden, Portland, Oregon
 Leland I (1975), Portland, Oregon (with Bonnie Bronson)
 Untitled fountain (1977), Portland, Oregon
 Arlie (1978)
 Elkhorn (1978–1979), Catlin Gabel School, Portland, Oregon
 Lava Ridge (1978), Whitman College, Walla Walla, Washington
 Nash (1978–1979), Portland, Oregon
 Memory II (1979)
 Trigger 4 (1979), Reed College, Portland, Oregon
 (Abstract) (1982), Portland, Oregon
 Akbar's Garden (1984), University of Oregon, Eugene, Oregon
 Arch with Oaks (1986), Beaverton, Oregon
 Four Columns (1988), Whitman College, Walla Walla, Washington
 Friendship Circle (1990), Tom McCall Waterfront Park, Portland, Oregon (with Michael Stirling)
 Angkor I (1994), Millennium Plaza Park, Lake Oswego, Oregon
 Angkor II
 Angkor IV (1995), Whitman College, Walla Walla, Washington
 Aksary (1996)
 Patan (1996)
 Memory 99 (1999), North Park Blocks, Portland, Oregon
 Wall Study #1 (1999)
 Wall Study #2 (1999)
 Akbar's Elephant (2000)
 Bird Series I (2003)
 Rajastan III (2004)
 Henry Ford at Delphi (2005)
 Mughal Garden (2005)
 Leaving Kathmandu (2006)
 Sulphur Butterfly (2006)
 Howard's Way (2007), Portland, Oregon
 Kyoto 8 (2008)
 Memory IX (2008)
 Goddess Revisited I (2009)
 Goddess Revisited II (2009)
 Goddess Revisited III (2009)
 Goddess Revisited IV (2009)
 Study for Henry Ford at Delphi (2009)
 Sound Garden (2010), Bend, Oregon
 moontrap (2011), Oregon City, Oregon
 Nepal I (2011)
 Nepal II (2011)
 Study for a Large Sculpture #1 (2011)
 Study for a Large Sculpture #2 (2011)
 Study for a Large Sculpture #3 (2011)
 Study for a Large Sculpture #4 (2011)
 Study for Nepal I (2011)
 Study for Nepal II (2011)
 Atacama I (2012)
 Atacama II (2012)
 Atacama III (2012)
 Atacama IV (2012)
 C'hacabuco I (2012)
 C'hacabuco II (2012)
 C'hacabuco III (2012)
 Pumalin (2012)
 Pumalina I (2012)
 Pumalina II (2012)
 Pavilion II (2013)

References

Kelly, Lee